John Cason (February 9, 1895 – death unknown) was an American Negro league catcher between 1918 and 1928. 

A native of Norfolk, Virginia, Cason made his Negro leagues debut in 1918 with the Brooklyn Royal Giants. He spent the majority of his career with Brooklyn, but also played for the Hilldale Club and Birmingham Black Barons, and finished his career in 1928 with the Bacharach Giants and Lincoln Giants.

References

External links
 and Baseball-Reference Black Baseball stats and Seamheads

1895 births
Place of death missing
Year of death missing
Bacharach Giants players
Birmingham Black Barons players
Brooklyn Royal Giants players
Hilldale Club players
Lincoln Giants players
Baseball catchers
Baseball players from Norfolk, Virginia